ZST (pronounced Zest) is a Japan-based mixed martial arts promotion and sanctioning organization holding amateur and semi-professional MMA events. ZST adopts unique rules in the MMA industry and also used to hold tag-team MMA matches.

History

Before establishment
ZST was conceived in efforts to accommodate fighters of puroresu MMA promotion RINGS that went defunct in February 2002. On September 22, 2002, Takeshi Caesar, the president of Shoot Boxing Association (SBA), and Koki Hioki, representative of ZST, had a conversation after a Shoot Boxing event, and they announced that SBA would support ZST. For this reason, ZST promoted some matches under shoot boxing rule early on.

First event
The first ZST event "The Battle Field ZST Opening Event" was arranged on November 23, 2002 in Tokyo, and it has since experienced a dramatic increase in popularity possibly in large part due to their highly different rule format. In this event, not only usual MMA matches but MMA tag match also was held among Takumi Yano, Masakazu Imanari and Remigijus Morkevicius, Mindaugas Stankos
.

ZST GP
On November 23, 2003, "ZST GP Opening" was held in Tokyo.

On May 17, 2008, ZST announced a major partnership with DEEP. The partnership will allow the two organizations to co-promote shows, share fighters and eventually unify the organizations.

Rules

ZST Rule
Bouts consist of three rounds with a rest period of one and a half minutes. The first and second rounds are five minutes in duration and the third round is three minutes in duration, but the third round is an extra round. Punches, elbow strikes, knees and kicks are allowed to the head and body when both fighters are standing. On the ground punches, elbow strikes, knees and kicks are only allowed to the body. Bouts are not judged. In the event that the bout goes the full-time, the bout is ruled a draw.

Grappling rule (GT-F Rule)
Bouts consist of two rounds with a rest period of one and two minutes. The first and second rounds are five minutes in duration. The positioning is not regarded for scoring as important factor and any motions including clinching and holding which impedes bouts are prohibited. GT-F came from "Grappling Tournament - Featherweight".

Events
ZST holds various types of events depending on their theme.
ZST
The main events held regularly under ZST rule for the top contenders.
ZST GP
The tournament events under KOK rule. The events are divided to twice.
Battle Hazard
The events focusing the matches which are not under ZST rule.
GT-F
The tournament events of grappling.
Genesis
The opening matches of ZST and Battle Hazard for the fresh professional contenders.
SWAT!
The events focusing the fresh professional contenders who currently participate Genesis matches. It holds "Genesis tournament" every year, and it is an actual freshmen tournament.
Pre Stage
The events of grappling for the amateur contenders.

Weight division
ZST sets 11 weight divisions.

References

External links
Official site (in Japanese)
ZST channel on youtube.com
ZST event results at sherdog

Mixed martial arts organizations
Sports organizations of Japan